Miguel Angel Diaz (born 1938) is an Argentine boxing trainer who has trained fighters from Latin America and from the United States. Diaz was selected to receive the Futch–Condon Award for the 1999 Trainer of the Year by the Boxing Writers Association of America, and was inducted into the World Boxing Hall of Fame on November 15, 2008.

Diaz began boxing when he was eight years old, and experienced twenty-seven amateur outings, but had a very short career as a professional boxer, having only one fight and then retired from boxing as a fighter.

Diaz moved to Los Angeles, California, where he established the Miguel Diaz boxing gym. One of his first world champions was Pedro Decima. He also trained Erik Morales who knocked Daniel Zaragoza out in eleven rounds at El Paso, Texas for the WBC world Bantamweight championship. Diaz then began traveling between Los Angeles and Tijuana to help train Morales. Miguel Diaz also worked as a cutman/co-trainer for Diego 'Chico' Corrales and Floyd 'Money' Mayweather. This created a conflict when they fought. Rather than stay with Mayweather, whom he had a longer relationship with he decided to work Corrales' corner. Mayweather was professional but let Diaz know he wouldn't work with Diaz again if he made this decision. Diaz was confident in Corrales' victory, had a bigger role with Corrales, and was getting a larger percentage of the fighters purse for working in this capacity. Mayweather dominated the fight and won. Since then Miguel Diaz no longer worked with Corrales nor Mayweather. This resulted in millions of dollars of lost income as Mayweather went on to be one of the highest-grossing fighters in boxing history.

He went on to help train Fernando Vargas for a number of fights and established a second Miguel Diaz boxing gym, located in Las Vegas, Nevada.

Diaz later resided part-time in Puerto Rico, where he helped train brothers Miguel Angel and José Miguel Cotto as well as Daniel Jimenez, among others. Miguel Cotto reached world championship status, winning the WBO Junior Welterweight crown and later was inducted into the International Boxing Hall of Fame. He also coached Marcos Maidana.

References

External links

1938 births
Living people
Boxing trainers
Place of birth missing (living people)
Argentine male boxers